Night of the Juggler is a 1980 American neo-noir action crime drama exploitation thriller film starring James Brolin.

Plot
A former cop (James Brolin), aligns with a street smart young clerk from the New York City dog pound (Julie Carmen) on a  search for his daughter, who is kidnapped by a psychopath (Cliff Gorman) after being mistaken for a wealthy man's daughter. His search is met with obstacles as he runs afoul of the police in his pursuit, including a corrupt former colleague bent on revenge against him. Meanwhile, the kidnapper is just as prepared to kill anybody, including his young hostage, unless his ransom demands are met.

Cast
 James Brolin as Sean Boyd
 Cliff Gorman as Gus Soltic 
 Richard S. Castellano as Lieutenant Tonelli 
 Julie Carmen as Maria 
 Linda Miller as Barbara Boyd 
 Abby Bluestone as Kathy Boyd 
 Barton Heyman as The Preacher 
 Dan Hedaya as Sergeant Barnes 
 Sully Boyar as Larry, The Dog Catcher 
 Mandy Patinkin as Allesandro, The Cabbie
 Marco St. John as Hampton Richmond Clayton

References

External links
 
 
 

1980 films
1980s action thriller films
1980s crime drama films
1980s crime thriller films
American action thriller films
American crime drama films
1980s English-language films
Films directed by Robert Butler
Films scored by Artie Kane
Columbia Pictures films
Films based on American novels
Films about child abduction in the United States
Films set in New York City
1980 drama films
1980s American films